The Premier League Golden Boot is an annual association football award presented to the leading goalscorer in the Premier League. For sponsorship purposes, it was called the Carling Golden Boot from 1994 to 2001, the Barclaycard Golden Boot from 2002 to 2004, the Barclays Golden Boot from 2005 to 2016, the Cadbury Golden Boot from 2017 to 2020, and the Coca-Cola Zero Sugar Golden Boot for 2021. Since 2022, it is referred to as the Castrol Golden Boot. In addition to the trophy, winners of the Golden Boot are usually given £1,000 for every goal they scored throughout the season to donate to a charity of their choice, although Robin van Persie was given £30,000 after scoring 26 goals in the 2012–13 season.

The Premier League was founded in 1992, when the clubs of the First Division left the Football League and established a new commercially independent league that negotiated its own broadcast and sponsorship agreements. The newly formed league had no sponsor for its inaugural season until Carling agreed to a four-year £12 million deal that started the following season, and it was simply known as the Premier League in its first year. As a result, the award was called the "Premier League Golden Boot" when Teddy Sheringham received the inaugural award in 1993. Originally consisting of 22 teams, the league contracted to 20 teams after the 1994–95 season; this reduced the number of games played from 42 to 38.

Thierry Henry has won the Golden Boot on four occasions, more than any other player. Jimmy Floyd Hasselbaink and Dwight Yorke were the first non-English and non-European winners, respectively, when they shared the award with Michael Owen in 1999. Alan Shearer is the only player other than Henry to win the award in three consecutive seasons. Phillips, Henry, Cristiano Ronaldo and Luis Suárez won the European Golden Shoe in the same season as the Premier League Golden Boot, with Henry achieving this on two occasions (2004 and 2005). Shearer, Hasselbaink and Van Persie are the only players to win the Golden Boot with two clubs.

Andy Cole and Shearer – with 34 goals in 1993–94 and 1994–95, respectively – scored the most goals to win the Golden Boot when the Premier League was a 42-game season, Mohamed Salah with 32 goals in 2017–18 holds the record for the current 38-game season, while Nicolas Anelka scored the fewest to clinch the award outright, with 19 goals in 2008–09. The all-time record for lowest number of goals scored to be bestowed the award, however, is 18 goals; this was achieved during the 1997–98 and 1998–99 seasons, when the award was shared between three players both times. The latter season marked the last time the Golden Boot was shared until 2010–11, when Dimitar Berbatov and Carlos Tevez both scored 20 goals that season to tie for the award. Harry Kane recorded the highest goals-to-games ratio to win the award, scoring 29 goals in 30 games in 2016–17 for a rate of 0.97. The Premier League Golden Boot is currently shared by Son Heung-min and Mohamed Salah, with 23 goals each.

Winners

Awards won by player

Awards won by nationality

Awards won by club

See also

List of English football first tier top scorers
List of footballers with 100 or more Premier League goals
List of footballers in England by number of league goals
List of top Premier League goal scorers by season
Pichichi Trophy
List of Bundesliga top scorers by season
European Golden Shoe
List of Ligue 1 top scorers
Capocannoniere
FA WSL Golden Boot – the equivalent award in women's football

Notes

References
General

Specific

Golden Boot
Golden Boot
England 1
Association football player non-biographical articles